Gibberula quadrifasciata is a species of sea snail, a marine gastropod mollusk, in the family Cystiscidae.

References

quadrifasciata
Gastropods described in 1873
Cystiscidae